The 2008–09 CERS Cup was the 29th season of the CERS Cup, Europe's second club roller hockey competition organized by CERH. 27 teams from eight national associations qualified for the competition as a result of their respective national league placing in the previous season. Following a preliminary phase and two knockout rounds, Mataró won the tournament.

Preliminary phase 

|}

Knockout stage
The knockout stage consisted in double-legged series for the round of 16 and the quarterfinals, where the four winners would join the Final Four, that was played in Lloret de Mar.

See also
2008–09 CERH European League
2009 CERH Women's European Cup

References

External links
 CERH website
 RinkHockey.net

World Skate Europe Cup
CERS Cup
CERS Cup